Grangeville is the largest city in and the county seat of Idaho County, Idaho, United States, in the north central part of the state. Its population was 3,141 at the 2010 census, down from 3,228 in 2000.

Geography

Grangeville is located on the Camas Prairie, with the mountains of the Nez Perce National Forest rising just to the south of the city. U.S. Route 95 passes along the western edge of the city as it travels north-south through the state. Idaho State Highway 13 has a terminus at U.S. 95 in Grangeville, and passes through the city as Main Street. The Idaho County Airport is located one nautical mile north of the central business district.

Climate
According to the Köppen climate classification system, Grangeville has a humid continental climate (Köppen Dfb).

Demographics

2010 census
As of the census of 2010, there were 3,141 people, 1,389 households, and 841 families living in the city. The racial makeup of the city was 94.8% White, 0.2% African American, 1.4% Native American, 0.6% Asian, 0.1% Pacific Islander, 0.9% from other races, and 1.9% from two or more races. Hispanic or Latino of any race were 3.6% of the population.

There were 1,389 households, of which 27.7% had children under the age of 18 living with them, 46.5% were married couples living together, 9.7% had a female householder with no husband present, 4.3% had a male householder with no wife present, and 39.5% were non-families. 35.0% of all households were made up of individuals, and 15.5% had someone living alone who was 65 years of age or older. The average household size was 2.21 and the average family size was 2.83.

The median age in the city was 44 years. 23.1% of residents were under the age of 18; 6.2% were between the ages of 18 and 24; 21.5% were from 25 to 44; 28.8% were from 45 to 64; and 20.3% were 65 years of age or older. The gender makeup of the city was 48.7% male and 51.3% female.

2000 census
As of the census of 2000, there were 3,228 people, 1,333 households, and 857 families living in the city. The racial makeup of the city was 96.34% White, 0.03% African American, 1.15% Native American, 0.28% Asian, 0.03% Pacific Islander, 0.68% from other races, and 1.49% from two or more races. Hispanic or Latino of any race were 1.64% of the population.

There were 1,333 households, out of which 31.2% had children under the age of 18 living with them, 52.1% were married couples living together, 9.1% had a female householder with no husband present, and 35.7% were non-families. 32.5% of all households were made up of individuals, and 15.2% had someone living alone who was 65 years of age or older. The average household size was 2.34 and the average family size was 2.96.

In the city, the population was spread out, with 25.8% under the age of 18, 5.6% from 18 to 24, 24.0% from 25 to 44, 24.3% from 45 to 64, and 20.3% who were 65 years of age or older. The median age was 42 years. For every 100 females, there were 87.7 males. For every 100 females age 18 and over, there were 83.1 males.

The median income for a household in the city was $27,984, and the median income for a family was $34,625. Males had a median income of $27,369 versus $16,179 for females. The per capita income for the city was $14,774. About 10.6% of families and 13.6% of the population were below the poverty line, including 15.0% of those under the age of 18 and 10.4% of those 65 and older.

Arts and culture 

Grangeville's "Border Days" is a large public celebration on the weekend of July 4 (Independence Day), which features the state's oldest rodeo as well as parades, art shows, and the world's largest egg toss.

Education
Grangeville's public schools are operated by the Mountain View School District #244, headed by Grangeville High School at the southern end of the city.

Infrastructure

Transportation

Highways
 – US 95 – to Lewiston and Moscow (north) and Riggins and Boise (south)
 – SH-13 – to Kooskia and Missoula, Montana (north)

Airport
Idaho County Airport is a county-owned, public-use airport located north of the central business district of Grangeville.

Railroad
For over nine decades, the Camas Prairie Railroad served the city. Grangeville was the eastern terminus of its second subdivision, known as the "Railroad on Stilts" due to its abundant timber trestles. Citing lack of profitability, its new owners received permission from the federal government to abandon the line in 2000. The line was revived by BG&CM, but now terminates in Cottonwood. Passenger service to Grangeville was discontinued decades earlier, in August 1955.

Notable people
Skip Brandt, former member of the Idaho Senate
George Cowgill, anthropologist and archaeologist, specialist in Mesoamerica
Warren Cowgill, historical linguist, specialist in Indo-European languages
Matt Hill (born 1978), NFL player
Larry Ramos (1942–2014), Grammy award-winning singer, best known as part of the pop band the Association ("Never My Love", "Windy")
Charlotte May Pierstorff (1908–1987), known for being shipped through mail by U.S. Post Office parcel post
Ken Schrom (born 1954), MLB pitcher (1980–87), was born and raised in Grangeville

References

External links

Grangeville Chamber of Commerce

Cities in Idaho
Cities in Idaho County, Idaho
County seats in Idaho